Panhispanism (Spanish: panhispanismo) (usually just called "hispanism" (Spanish: hispanismo)) is a political trend aimed to achieve social, economic, and political cooperation, as well as often political unification, of the Spanish-speaking countries, mainly those of Hispanic America. It focuses principally on the former Spanish Empire's territories in North, Central and South America. It has been present consistently in literature, revolutionary movements, and political institutions. The term may be also used to talk specifically about projects of Hispanic American unity held by Simón Bolívar and José de San Martín, despite Hispanic areas outside the Americas not included in this definition.

Background
The Spanish colonization of America began in 1492 and ultimately was part of a larger historical process of world colonialism through which various European powers incorporated a considerable amount of territory and peoples in the Americas, in Asia, and in Africa between the 15th and the 20th centuries. Hispanic America became the main part of the vast Spanish Empire.

Due to Napoleon's invasion of Spain from 1808 to 1814 and the consequent chaos, the dismemberment of the Spanish Empire was initiated as American territories began to move towards independence. The only remaining Spanish holdings in the Americas were Cuba and Puerto Rico by 1830 until the 1898 Spanish–American War.

Present-day developments 
In the Hispanic world today, panhispanism is largely anti-American and opposes "Anglo-Saxon" influence in general in Hispanic territories, viewing it as imperialist. Social media has also been identified as a catalyst for a resurgence in panhispanic sentiment. YouTubers such as "Brigada Antifraude" and Santiago Armesilla are popular proponents of panhispanism, having channels with thousands of views and subscribers, in which they defend the idea of a Hispanic union and attack the Black Legend. In Puerto Rico, there exists a movement to reunify the island with Spain as its proposed 18th autonomous region, and in Peru, right-wing protestors have been seen carrying the old flag of the Spanish Empire. In 2022 the organization Parlamento Global Hispano (English: Hispanic Global Parliament) was created as an international Hispanic provisional assembly aiming to move the Hispanic world towards economic and political integration; its first elections were held from September to October.

See also
Hispanic America
Association of Spanish Language Academies
Spanish American wars of independence
Hispanidad
Patria Grande
La Raza
Pan-Latinism
Pan-nationalism
Pan-Americanism
Mediterraneanism
Iberian federalism

References

Further reading
Aken, Mark J. van. Pan-Hispanism: Its Origin and Development to 1866. Berkeley and Los Angeles: University of California Press 1959.

External links
 Fernando Ortiz y la polémica del panhispanismo y el panamericanismo en el siglo XX en Cuba (in Spanish)
El Sueño de la Madre Patria, (The Dream of the Mother Country) written by Isidro Sepúlveda Muñoz (in Spanish)
Portal de Mercosur

Hispanidad
Spanish nationalism
Hispanic America
Spanish irredentism